Intellectual disability-spasticity-ectrodactyly syndrome, also known as Jancar syndrome, is a rare autosomal recessive genetic disorder which is characterized by severe intellectual disabilities, hereditary spastic paraplegia, and defects of the distal limbs, such as syndactyly, ectrodactyly, and clinodactyly. Only 3 families in England and Israel have been described in medical literature.

References 

Syndromes